James Allen Sperry (September 24, 1930 – January 5, 2021) was an American politician who served as a Democratic member of the South Dakota House of Representatives, representing District 2 from 1997 to 1998.

Sperry was born in Aberdeen, South Dakota, and died as a result of COVID-19 at a hospital in Aberdeen amid the COVID-19 pandemic in South Dakota. He was 90.

References 

1930 births
2021 deaths
People from Aberdeen, South Dakota
Members of the South Dakota House of Representatives
Deaths from the COVID-19 pandemic in South Dakota
South Dakota Democrats